Workers' Party (in Spanish: Partido de los Trabajadores) is a communist political party which operates in Spain. It was founded in 1979 through the merger of the Party of Labour of Spain (PTE) and the Workers Revolutionary Organisation (ORT).

The Catalan branch of PT was known as Partit dels Treballadors de Catalunya (Workers' Party of Catalonia). It published Yesca.

The old PT was short-lived. In 1980, a severe internal crisis erupted, and the party last contested elections in 1987.

In February 2009, it was refunded and reactivated, becoming an active political organization again.

References

External links
Party website

1979 establishments in Spain
1987 disestablishments in Spain
2009 establishments in Spain
Communist parties in Spain
Defunct communist parties in Spain
Far-left politics in Spain
Political parties disestablished in 1987
Political parties established in 1979
Political parties established in 2009